Christopher Moore RHA MRIA MRHA (1790–1863) was an Irish-born sculptor operational mainly in England in the 19th century.

Life
He was born in Dublin in 1790. In 1819 he is listed as living at 2 Upper Gloucester Place, still in Dublin, but moved to London in 1820, aged 30, where he began exhibiting at the Royal Academy and in Brighton. In 1821 he was living and working on Tottenham Court Road. In 1829 he moved to 23 Howland Street.

He set up permanent residence in London in 1821, but made frequent returns to Ireland.
He exhibited in the Royal Academy 1821–1860 and at the British Institution 1821–1834. He exhibited at the Royal Hibernian Society from 1829 to 1861.

He died in Dorset Street,  Dublin, on 17 March 1863. He is buried in Glasnevin Cemetery in Dublin.

His portrait, by John Doyle, is held by the National Gallery of Ireland.

Known works
see
Combat between the Archangel Michael and Satan, pre-1820
Bust of Henry Grattan, 1821
Bust of Charles Phillips, barrister, 1821
General Sir John Doyle, 1822
Bust of Miss Grace Croft, 1823
Bust of Lord Nugent, 1823
Bust of Lord Denman, 1828
Bust of the artist Francis Danby, 1828
Bust of Daniel O'Connell, 1830
Bust of William Mulready, 1832
Bust of George Stephenson, 1832
Effigy of the dead child, Isabella Cooper, in Goathurst Church, Somerset, 1835
Bust of Solomon Cox, 1836
Bust of T S Goodenough, 1838
Bust of Lord Morpeth, Castle Howard, 1839
Bust of Daniel Murray, Archbishop of Dublin, 1841
Bust of Anne, Countess of Charlemont, Windsor Castle, 1841
Plaster bust of Lord Plunket, Castle Howard, 1841
Bust of Lady Dover, Castle Howard, 1842
Bust of John Philpot Curran, St Patrick's Cathedral, Dublin, 1842 (erected 1845)
Bust of Sir Henry Marsh, surgeon, 1843
Bust of Thomas Moore, poet, 1843
Bust of Sir Philip Crampton, surgeon, 1843
General Sir Edward Blakeney, 1844
Bust of Thomas Norton Longman, publisher, Hampstead Parish Church, 1845
Bust of Sir Maziere Brady, 1846
Bust of Robert Holmes, 1847
Bust of Richard Lalor Shiel, National Gallery of Ireland, 1848
Bust of Viscount Southwell, 1849
Bust of Edmund Burke, formerly in Crystal Palace, 1850
Bust of John Doyle the artist, 1850 (probably done in artistic exchange for Doyle's portrait of Moore)
Bust of Lord Brougham, 1851
Bust of Benjamin Guinness, 1852
Bust of Cardinal Wiseman, 1853
Bust of the Earl Of Derby, 1853
Bust of George Howard, 7th Earl of Carlisle,n.d.
Wax portrait of George Papworth, Irish National Museum, n.d.

References

1790 births
1863 deaths
Irish sculptors
Artists from Dublin (city)